The Gatwick Aviation Museum is located in the village of Charlwood, in Surrey, United Kingdom on the boundary of Gatwick Airport.

History
Originally started in 1987 as a private collection by local businessman Peter Vallance, the museum became a registered charity in 1999 with the objective of providing awareness of local aviation history and as an educational centre for the general public, particularly for local students and schoolchildren. A close relationship exists between the museum and the Central Sussex College which uses the museum's facilities to provide practical training for the students taking aerospace courses.

The museum has a varied collection of aircraft, aircraft engines and over 500 aircraft models. The museum also has displays and artefacts related to local aviation history particularly Gatwick Airport. Subject to serviceability, certain aircraft including the Avro Shackleton MR3, Blackburn Buccaneer S1, English Electric Lightning F.53 and Percival Sea Prince can  are usually capable of performing engine runs for visitors on special event days. 

The museum had been in dispute since July 2011 with Mole Valley District Council concerning planning permission, as, despite its co-location with Gatwick Airport, the council refused permission for a permanent museum site due to a concern over the height of the proposed new building and the location within the Metropolitan Green Belt. Vallance lodged a planning appeal against the decision in January 2012, which was dismissed in June of that year. On 14 January 2013, Vallance died during heart surgery but since then, the museum has been run by a charitable trust set up by Vallance to cover this eventuality and the museum's planning permission was approved in 2015.

Reopened
In 2016, the new museum building first opened to the public. It houses many aircraft formerly kept outdoors although others in the collection, including some noteworthy examples, were disposed of by the trust in 2013.  A shop, refreshment area, flight simulator and information on the history of Gatwick Airport can also be found in the building. The museum is open to the public every Friday, Saturday and Sunday.

Vallance Airstrip

Vallance Airstrip was a small grass airstrip located in the grounds of the Gatwick Aviation Museum and within Class Delta Airspace with airliners continually departing and arriving on Gatwick's adjacent runway situated roughly 400 metres to the south. The airstrip was named after Gatwick Aviation Museum founder Peter Vallance and used occasionally by light aircraft including a resident Cessna. Before operating there, all pilots had to have prior permission and a briefing from the airstrip owners, Terminal Control Gatwick and Gatwick Aerodrome Control. The airstrip ceased to be used from late 2018 / early 2019.

Aircraft on Display

Outside

Avro Shackleton Mk.3 PH3 ("J" WR982)
Blackburn Buccaneer S1 (XN923)
Hawker Hunter F51
Percival Sea Prince T1 (WP308)

Indoors
English Electric Lightning F53 (53-671)
de Havilland Sea Vixen TT.8 (XS587)
de Havilland Venom FB50 (J1605)
Gloster Meteor T7 (VZ638)
Hawker Hunter T7 (XL591)
Hawker Sea Hawk FB5 (XE364)
Hawker Siddeley Harrier GR3 (XV751)

Nose Sections/Cockpits
Britten-Norman BN-2 Islander
English Electric Canberra
English Electric Lightning

Engines on Display

Armstrong Siddeley Double Mamba
Armstrong Siddeley Sapphire
Armstrong Siddeley Viper
Bristol Centaurus
Bristol Hercules
Bristol Proteus
Continental O-200
de Havilland Ghost
de Havilland Gipsy Minor
de Havilland Gipsy Queen
de Havilland Goblin
de Havilland Gyron Junior
General Electric CF6
Rolls-Royce Avon 122
Rolls-Royce Avon 208
Rolls-Royce Avon 301
Rolls-Royce Avon RA2
Rolls-Royce Dart
Rolls-Royce Derwent
Rolls-Royce Griffon 58
Rolls-Royce Merlin
Rolls-Royce Nene
Rolls-Royce Olympus 320
Rolls-Royce Pegasus
Rolls-Royce Spey
Rolls-Royce Turbomeca Adour
Turbomeca Artouste
Turbomeca Palouste

See also
List of aerospace museums

References

 Registered Charity No. 1075858
 
 Gatwick Aviation Museum - Official Guide

External links

 Gatwick Aviation Museum

Aerospace museums in England
Museums in Surrey
Gatwick Airport